is a Japanese-only action RPG released in 1995 by Culture Brain. This game is part of the Super Chinese series and is the third game in the series to appear on the Game Boy.

External links
Super Chinese Land 3 at GameFAQs

Role-playing video games
Super Chinese
Game Boy games
Game Boy-only games
Japan-exclusive video games
Culture Brain games
Action role-playing video games
1995 video games
Video games developed in Japan
Multiplayer and single-player video games